Sonnino  may refer to:

 Sonnino, town and comune in the Lazio, central Italy
 Sonnino (surname), Italian surname
 Sonnino I Cabinet
 Sonnino II Cabinet